Madhukar may refer to:

Madhukar (author), Advaitin, Jnani Yogi and (German-born) philosophical author
CV Madhukar, director of PRS Legislative Research